Aleksandr Rudenko may refer to:

 Aleksandr Rudenko (footballer, born 1993), Russian football player
 Aleksandr Rudenko (footballer, born 1999), Russian football player